Quanita and Quanitta is a feminine given name. Notable people with the name include:

Quanita Adams, South African stage and screen actress
Quanita Bobbs (born 1993), South African field hockey player
Quanitta Underwood (born 1984), American boxer

Feminine given names